Wafū Sōhonke (和風総本家) is a TV program which was produced by TV Osaka and aired on the TV Tokyo network. An edited version was shown on the Netflix streaming service, using the title "Japanese Style Originator". The show also airs with English subtitles on Nippon Golden Network.

The format of the show was initially a quiz show with one presenter or MC and five panelists. Panelists had to answer questions about Japanese etiquette, food, tradition, culture, and conventions to score points. The program often included meibutsu or tokusanhin in its final segment. In 2018, the name was changed to Japanese Style Originator - 2nd Generation and the format was updated to the panelists simply giving commentary on the aired segments.

History 

The show was originally broadcast as a "Japanese style test", shown in the "Sunday Big Variety" time slot. On November 4, 2007, the production station was changed from TV Tokyo to affiliate TV Osaka. Once transferred, the program title was changed to "Japanese Style Originator", broadcasting from February 18, 2008 (Monday) 19:00–20:48 (JST). From April 14 of the same year, regular broadcasting started every Monday at 20:00–20:54 (JST), and from October 2009, the time slot was changed to every Thursday at 21:00–21:54 (JST). The program ran for 10 and a half years (until March 2020), the second longest-running program after "Thursday Western Painting Theater".

Since around 2011, remote segments focusing on specific themes and topics are mainly held, especially many times about Japanese craftsmen, and several introductions of Japanese etiquette and tradition. In most episodes, a final narration is performed at the end of the segment to finalize the theme.

Since the October 8th “Thursday 8 o'clock concert ~ Masterpiece! Nippon no Uta” broadcast, the show became extremely popular in Japan.

On June 29, 2012, the message of condolences was written on the official website in response to the death of Takeo Chii, who appeared regularly on the program since the program's inception until his last appearance on February 16, 2012. On February 8, 2018, the first collaboration with "a clinic where a doctor can be found" was performed, featuring Takahiro Azuma, Hisako Manda, and Kazuya Masuda (TV Tokyo announcer at the time).

A two-hour special was broadcast on September 20, 2018, representing the end of Season 1. The host, Kazuya Masuda, did not return for Season 2.

From October 11, 2018, the name of the show was changed to Japanese Style Originator - 2nd Generation and the set was updated. With the new season, Suzuki Fuku (child actor) joins as a new regular performer. Suzuki, Manda and Azuma would remain in the studio, commenting, while watching the remote segments with the other casts and craftsmen in the studio recording. The quiz segment of the show was abolished, but quizzes such as "Let's spot Nippon!" continued to be held in the form of mini corners.

The program officially ended its broadcast on March 19, 2020.

Cast
 Kazuya Masuda (the MC / 2008–2018)
 Takeo Chii (2008–2012)
 Hisako Manda (2008–2020)
 Takahiro Azuma (2008–2020)
 Takahiro Higashi (2012–2020)
 Fuku Suzuki (2018–2020)

Narrated by:
 Miyoko Asō (2008–2018)
 Youichirō Aoi (2008–2020)
 Gin Maeda (2018–2020)
 Sumi Shimamoto (2018–2020)

See also 
 Japanese craft
 Meibutsu
 Meisho

References

External links
Official site

TV Tokyo original programming
2008 Japanese television series debuts
2020 Japanese television series endings
Japanese variety television shows